The glasshead grenadier (Hymenocephalus italicus) is a species of fish in the family Macrouridae.

Description

Its snout is obtuse and projects slightly beyond the mouth. Its barbel is small, and its scales are thin, deciduous, spiny and large.

Habitat

Behaviour
The glasshead grenadier feeds on pelagic copepods, euphausiids and gammarid amphipods, shrimp, ostracods, cumaceans and other small crustaceans.

References

Macrouridae
Fish described in 1884
Taxa named by Enrico Hillyer Giglioli